Setong Sena (1964-2015), was an Indian politician from Arunachal Pradesh. He was elected to the Arunachal Pradesh Legislative Assembly from Nampong Assembly constituency in 1995, 1999, 2004 and 2009 Arunachal Pradesh Legislative Assembly election as a member of Indian National Congress.Sena has also served as the Speaker and Cabinet Minister in Arunachal Pradesh Legislative Assembly.

References

1964 births
2015 deaths
 Indian National Congress politicians from Arunachal Pradesh
Naga people
North-Eastern Hill University alumni